Jaime Salvador Valls (4 November 1901 – 18 October 1976) was a Spanish screenwriter and film director of the Golden era of Mexican cinema. He is known for writing and directing various low-budget comedies, westerns, and rancheras.

Selected filmography
 Castillos en el aire  (1938)
 The Unknown Policeman (1941, writer only)
 Gran Hotel (1944, writer only)
 Marina (1945)
 A Day with the Devil (1945, writer only)
 Boom in the Moon, aka The Modern-Day Bluebeard (1946)
 I Am a Fugitive (1946, writer only)
 Fly Away, Young Man! (1947, writer only)
 The Genius (1948, writer only)
 The Magician (1949, writer only)
 The Atomic Fireman (1952, writer only)
 The Photographer (1953, writer only)
 Here Are the Aguilares! (1957)
 Se los chupó la bruja (1958)
 Los muertos no hablan (1958)
 Yo... el aventurero (1959)
 Two Cheap Husbands (1960)
 Qué perra vida (1962)
 La señora Muerte (1969)

External links

1901 births
1976 deaths
Spanish film directors
Spanish male writers
Male screenwriters
20th-century Spanish screenwriters
20th-century Spanish male writers